Joe Thomas Tate (4 August 1904 in Old Hill, Cradley Heath, England – 18 May 1973 in Cradley Heath) was an English footballer.

Career

Club
Tate played for Stourbridge Council School, Birch Coppice Primitives, Grainger's Lane Primitives, Round Oak Steel Works FC (Brierley Hill) and Cradley Heath before joining Aston Villa in April 1925. After making a total of 193 appearances, and scoring four goals for the club, he joined Brierley Hill Alliance as player-manager. His wife, Nellie Tate was a teacher at Reddall Hill Primary School, Cradley Heath.

International
He gained a total of three caps for the England national team.

References

1904 births
1973 deaths
English footballers
England international footballers
Association football wing halves
Aston Villa F.C. players
People from Cradley Heath
English Football League representative players
English Football League players
Brierley Hill Alliance F.C. players